34th meridian may refer to:

34th meridian east, a line of longitude east of the Greenwich Meridian
34th meridian west, a line of longitude west of the Greenwich Meridian